BluSmart Mobility, is an Indian ride-sharing company, headquartered in Gurugram, India.  It was founded by Anmol Singh Jaggi, Punit K Goyal and Puneet Singh Jaggi in 2019. , the company's fleet of vehicles includes the Mahindra e-Verito, Tata e-Tigor, Tata Xpres-T EV, Hyundai Kona Electric and MG ZS Electric. It is India's first all electric shared smart mobility platform.

History 
BluSmart was co-founded on 14 January 2019 by Anmol Singh Jaggi, Puneet Singh Jaggi, and Punit K Goyal. In the same month, BluSmart partnered with Mahindra & Mahindra to launch the first batch of EVs on the platform.

On World EV Day 2021, BluSmart announced a partnership with Jio-BP to set up charging infrastructure across India.

On the occasion of World Environment Day 2022, Tata Motors signed an MoU with BluSmart to deliver 10,000 EVs. In July 2022, BluSmart received Verra accreditation on carbon emission.

Business model 
BluSmart functions on an asset-light business model. Cars are procured on a monthly lease from companies like EESL. The company's mobile application can be used to purchase rides that are  similar to Uber, Ola Cabs and Lyft. The company advertises itself as the 100% electric mobility solution in the world. The company uses all electric cars with their own branding on it.

Services 
BluSmart operates in Gurugram and South Delhi. Users can book a cab using the Android or iOS Mobile App. In June 2020, BluSmart also introduced imulti-hour rentals.

In April 2021, BluSmart initiated a COVID-19 vaccination drive for its drivers, whose vaccination status is visible on the BluSmart mobile app.

BluSmart also launched EV intercity rides from Delhi NCR to Chandigarh, Jaipur.

Challenges in growth 
Unlike its competitors, BluSmart's expansion faces several hindrances. Because BluSmart operates on a hub-to-hub model, lack of charging infrastructure in India and range anxiety of EVs poses serious hurdles in the company's growth. Because their cars are not driver-owned assets, high maintenance costs might further complicate its scaling-up process.

References

External links

Taxi companies